Reggie Gilbert Ford (5 March 1907 – 2 October 1981) was an English cricketer. He played 57 matches for Gloucestershire between 1929 and 1936.

References

External links

1907 births
1981 deaths
English cricketers
Gloucestershire cricketers
Cricketers from Bristol